Acrobasis zyziphella is a species of snout moth in the genus Acrobasis. It was described by Rebel in 1914. It is found in Egypt.

References

Moths described in 1914
Acrobasis
Endemic fauna of Egypt
Moths of Africa